Christopher Joseph Scelfo (born September 30, 1963) is an American football coach. He was most recently  the offensive line coach for the DC Defenders of the XFL. He was the offensive line coach and run-game coordinator for the Arizona Hotshots of the Alliance of American Football, having previously served in a similar position with the Houston Cougars and Charlotte 49ers. He previously served as the tight ends coach for the Atlanta Falcons of the National Football League (NFL). He served as head coach at Tulane from 1998 to 2006, including in the aftermath of Hurricane Katrina, and amassed a 37–57 record. He previously held assistant coaching positions at Marshall and Georgia.

Early life
Scelfo was born in Abbeville, Louisiana on September 30, 1963, and later lived in New Iberia, Louisiana, where he attended New Iberia Senior High. He went on to college at Northeast Louisiana University. He played football in high school and college, and was a three-year letterwinner at both institutions. In college, he also served as the team captain. Scelfo graduated with a bachelor's degree from Northeast Louisiana in 1986 and received a master's degree from there in 1988.

Coaching career
Scelfo became a graduate assistant at his alma mater from 1986 to 1987, then in the same position at the University of Oklahoma from 1988 to 1989. He then served as the offensive line coach at Marshall University from 1990 to 1995, and also held the position of offensive coordinator in his last three seasons there. Scelfo then spent three seasons at the University of Georgia as assistant head and offensive line coach.

Tulane University in New Orleans hired Scelfo to replace Tommy Bowden as its 36th coach mid-season on December 7, 1998. The only game he coached that year was the Liberty Bowl, where he led the Green Wave to victory over Brigham Young. With the win, Tulane finished the season with a perfect 12–0 record and the Conference USA championship. In 2002, Scelfo led Tulane to the 2002 Hawaii Bowl, where they defeated June Jones' high-octane Hawaii Warriors. The Green Wave surprised observers by recovering an onside kick on the first play of the game, and went on to win, 36–28.

After Hurricane Katrina devastated New Orleans in August 2005, the Tulane football team was forced to play all 11 of its games on the road, each in a different city, which may have contributed to the Green Wave's 2–9 record. Ole Miss head coach Ed Orgeron contacted a Tulane assistant about players transferring in the wake of the hurricane. Scelfo accused Ole Miss of tampering and said:"In the worst natural disaster in the history of the United States, you've got to stoop pretty low to do that. You're lower than dirt ... I'm not going to tolerate that. There's people in our business that don't belong in our business."Tulane at end of the road; Katrina forced Green Wave into 11-stadium fall tour, The Dallas Morning News, November 25, 2005.The Southeastern Conference investigated the matter and exonerated Ole Miss of any wrongdoing.

After failing to compile a winning season since 2002, Tulane fired Scelfo on November 29, 2006. His final record at Tulane was 37–57. In January 2008, the Atlanta Falcons of the NFL hired Scelfo as its tight ends coach.

He later became the offensive line coach for the Charlotte 49ers and Houston Cougars. In 2019, he returned to the professional level as the offensive line coach and run-game coordinator for the Arizona Hotshots of the Alliance of American Football, followed by the DC Defenders of the XFL in 2020.

Personal life
Scelfo is married to wife Nancy née Caldwell, with whom he has a son and a daughter. His brother, Frank Scelfo, is currently the head coach at Southeastern Louisiana University. His nephew, Anthony Scelfo, played as a quarterback at Tulane. Scelfo's son, Joseph, played center at the University of South Alabama from 2012 to 2016. Following Joseph's junior year, he graduate transferred to NC State University for his final year. He signed as an undrafted free agent to the Houston Texans following the 2017 NFL Draft.

Head coaching record

References

1963 births
Living people
American football offensive linemen
Arizona Hotshots coaches
Atlanta Falcons coaches
DC Defenders coaches
Georgia Bulldogs football coaches
Louisiana–Monroe Warhawks football coaches
Louisiana–Monroe Warhawks football players
Marshall Thundering Herd football coaches
Oklahoma Sooners football coaches
People from Abbeville, Louisiana
People from New Iberia, Louisiana
Tulane Green Wave football coaches